Beechwood, also known as Jericho, is a historic home located near Beales, Southampton County, Virginia. The frame dwelling was built in several sections between about 1790 and late-19th centuries.  It consists of a two-story, three-bay main block dated to about 1790 with a side-hall, double pile plan.  It has a small one-bay wing at the east end; a two-bay, one-cell wing at the west; and a two-story, two-room ell off the west wing.  The front facade features a one-story pedimented porch with a dentil cornice and full entablature supported on Tuscan order columns.

It was listed on the National Register of Historic Places in 1979.

References

Houses on the National Register of Historic Places in Virginia
Houses completed in 1790
Houses in Southampton County, Virginia
National Register of Historic Places in Southampton County, Virginia